Gohia is a genus of South Pacific araneomorph spiders in the family Toxopidae, and was first described by R. de Dalmas in 1917.

Species
 it contains four species, all from New Zealand:
Gohia clarki Forster, 1964 – New Zealand (Campbell Is.)
Gohia falxiata (Hogg, 1909) (type) – New Zealand (Auckland Is.)
Gohia isolata Forster, 1970 – New Zealand
Gohia parisolata Forster, 1970 – New Zealand

References

Araneomorphae genera
Spiders of Oceania
Toxopidae